Jaime Lamo de Espinosa y Michels de Champourcin (born 4 April 1941) is a Spanish politician from the Union of the Democratic Centre (UCD) who served as Minister of Agriculture from February 1978 to December 1981.

References

1941 births
Living people
Government ministers of Spain
20th-century Spanish politicians
Agriculture ministers of Spain